Allison Mayfield (born October 3, 1989) is an American volleyball player, a member of the club Fatum Nyíregyháza.

Sporting achievements

Clubs 
Finnish Championship:
  2017
Peru Championship:
  2018
Hungarian Cup:
  2019
Hungarian Championship:
  2019

References

External links
 Women.Volleybox profile
 CEV profile
 TopStarAgency profile
 LML-Web.DataProject profile

1989 births
People from Kansas City, Kansas
Living people
American women's volleyball players
Expatriate volleyball players in France
Expatriate volleyball players in Switzerland
Expatriate volleyball players in Finland
Expatriate volleyball players in Greece
Expatriate volleyball players in Hungary
American expatriate sportspeople in France
American expatriate sportspeople in Switzerland
American expatriate sportspeople in Finland
American expatriate sportspeople in Peru
American expatriate sportspeople in Greece
American expatriate sportspeople in Hungary
21st-century American women
Kansas Jayhawks women's volleyball players